Chorzew Siemkowice is a Polish rail junction located in the Pajęczno County of the Łódź Voivodeship, in central part of Poland. It is located on the route of the Polish Coal Trunk-Line, here the Trunk-Line is joined by the Częstochowa - Chorzew Siemkowice line.

Railway stations in Poland opened in 1933
Railway stations in Łódź Voivodeship
Pajęczno County
Railway stations served by Przewozy Regionalne InterRegio